Pordeh Sar or Pordsar may refer to:
 Pordeh Sar, Alborz
 Pordeh Sar, Mazandaran